Yaroslav Myroslavovich Dumanskyi (4 August 1959 – 22 June 2021) was a Soviet professional footballer who played as a midfielder. He was a son of another Soviet player and coach Myroslav Dumanskyi.

External links
  Profile

1959 births
2021 deaths
Sportspeople from Ivano-Frankivsk
Soviet footballers
Ukrainian footballers
Association football midfielders
Soviet Top League players
FC Dynamo Kyiv players
FC Dynamo Moscow players
FC Karpaty Lviv players
FC Metalist Kharkiv players
FC Spartak Ivano-Frankivsk players